Thomas Gordon Watson (1 March 1914 – 29 April 2001) was an English football player and coach.

Career
Born in Wolsingham, Watson began his career with Blyth Spartans. He played for Everton between 1933 and 1948, and was a coach at the club from 1948 to 1968.

References

1914 births
2001 deaths
English footballers
Blyth Spartans A.F.C. players
Everton F.C. players
English Football League players
Association football wing halves
People from Wolsingham
Footballers from County Durham